Black Sabbath was a British heavy metal band.

Black Sabbath may  refer to:

 Black Sabbath (album), a 1970 album by Black Sabbath
 "Black Sabbath" (song), the title song
 Black Sabbath (compilation), a 2006 album by Black Sabbath
 Black Sabbath (film), a 1963 horror film by Mario Bava
 Black Sabbath MC, an American motorcycle club
 1942 Eleftherias Square roundup, or Black Sabbath, during the Holocaust in Greece
 Operation Agatha, or Black Sabbath, the 1946 British arrests of Jewish paramilitaries
 Shabbat Chazon, or "black sabbath", a Jewish Special Shabbat day
 Witches' Sabbath, or Black Sabbath, a purported gathering of witchcraft believers

See also
 Black Saturday (disambiguation)
 Black Sunday (disambiguation)
 Witches' Sabbath (disambiguation)